Ruan Zhexiang (born 21 January 1997) is a Chinese footballer who plays as a midfielder for Chinese club Dalian LFTZ Huayi.

Club career
Ruan Zhexiang was promoted to the senior team of Liaoning F.C. within the 2019 China League One season and would make his debut in a Chinese FA Cup game on 16 April 2019 against Baoding Yingli ETS in a 1-0 victory. He would go on to establish himself as a regular within the team, however the club disbanded due to wage arrears and he was allowed to leave the team. On 29 July 2020, Ruan would join Qingdao Huanghai.

Career statistics

References

External links

1997 births
Living people
Chinese footballers
Association football midfielders
China League One players
Chinese Super League players
Liaoning F.C. players
Qingdao F.C. players